Thatipur is a locality in Gwalior Metropolitan region in the Indian state of Madhya Pradesh. It lies 7 km from the Old city of Gwalior and just 3 km from city centre tehsil headquarters. It is usually referred to as the new town of Gwalior because of its modern infrastructure, wide roads, and modern amenities.

Etymology 
"Thatipur" came from the "34 Battalion" which was located there during the British Raj. Thatipur is said to have got its name from State Army Unit 34, which once resided there.

References

Cities and towns in Gwalior district
Gwalior
Cantonments of British India
Cantonments of India